Varedan (also Romanized as Vāredān and Vārdān; also known as Vārīdān and Yārīdān) is a village in Irandegan Rural District, Irandegan District, Khash County, Sistan and Baluchestan Province, Iran. At the 2006 census, its population was 184, in 46 families.

References 

Populated places in Khash County